The 2017 African-American Film Critics Association Awards were announced on December 12, 2017, while the ceremony took place on February 7, 2018, at Taglyan Complex in Hollywood, California.

Awards
Below is the list of complete winners.

AAFCA Top Ten Films
 Get Out (Universal Pictures)
 Three Billboards Outside Ebbing, Missouri (Fox Searchlight)
 Coco (Walt Disney Pictures/Pixar Animation Studios)
 Girls Trip (Universal Pictures)  
 Detroit (Annapurna Pictures)
 Call Me by Your Name (Sony Pictures Classics)  
 The Shape of Water (Fox Searchlight)
 Gook (Samuel Goldwyn Films)
 Crown Heights (Amazon Studios/IFC Films)
 Marshall (Open Road Films)

AAFCA Top Ten TV Shows
 Queen Sugar (OWN)
 Underground (WGN)
 Insecure (HBO)  
 Master of None (Netflix)
 Black-ish (ABC)
 The Handmaid's Tale (Hulu)
 Dear White People (Netflix)  
 She's Gotta Have It (Netflix)
 The Defiant Ones (HBO)
 Guerrilla / Snowfall (Showtime / FX)

AAFCA Regular Awards
 Best Picture
 Get Out

 Best Director
 Jordan Peele – Get Out

 Best Actor
 Daniel Kaluuya – Get Out

 Best Actress
 Frances McDormand – Three Billboards Outside Ebbing, Missouri

 Best Supporting Actor
 Laurence Fishburne – Last Flag Flying

 Best Supporting Actress
 Tiffany Haddish – Girls Trip

 Best Ensemble
 Detroit

 Best Comedy
 Girls Trip

 Best Independent Film
 Crown Heights

 Best Screenplay
 Jordan Peele – Get Out

 Breakout Performance
 Lakeith Stanfield – Crown Heights

 Best Animated Film
 Coco

 Best Documentary
 Step

 Best Foreign Film
 The Wound

 Best Song
 "It Ain't Fair" – Detroit

 Best TV Comedy
 Black-ish

 Best TV Drama
 Queen Sugar

 Best New Media
 Mudbound

AAFCA Special Awards

 AAFCA Special Achievement Award
 Jordan Peele, writer/director; Broderick Johnson and Andrew Kosove, producers; Claudia Puig, film critic; Channing Dungey, producer

See also
2017 in film

References

African-American Film Critics Association Awards
2017 film awards